The Pentecostal Assemblies of Newfoundland and Labrador (PAONL) is a Pentecostal denomination in the Canadian province of Newfoundland and Labrador. It is one of four Canadian branches of the World Assemblies of God Fellowship, the largest Pentecostal denomination in the world. The denomination claims approximately 117 affiliated churches. The PAONL has a close relationship to the Pentecostal Assemblies of Canada, its sister denomination within the World AG Fellowship, and is a member of the Evangelical Fellowship of Canada.

History
The PAONL traces its beginnings to the ministry of Pentecostal evangelist Alice Belle Garrigus from Rockville, Connecticut. In 1911, she founded the Bethesda Pentecostal Church in St. John's. By 1925, the number of Pentecostals and churches had grown enough to receive legal recognition from the Newfoundland government. Until 1949, Newfoundland and Labrador was a separate dominion from Canada, and the PAON developed separately from the Pentecostal Assemblies of Canada. Nevertheless, the two organizations share a common statement of faith and cooperate closely in overseas mission work. The two groups also share the Eastern Pentecostal Bible College in Peterborough, Ontario.

References

External links
Official Website

Assemblies of God National Fellowships
Finished Work Pentecostals
Pentecostal denominations in North America
Christian denominations in Canada
Christian organizations established in 1925